Viktar Mihailavich Hancharenka (Viktor Mikhailovich Goncharenko; born 10 June 1977), is a Belarusian football manager who is the head coach of Russian Premier League club FC Ural Yekaterinburg.

Early life and career

Formative years and education 
Viktar Mihailavich Hancharenka was born in 1977 to a middle-class family in Khoiniki, Belarus. He is the son of Mikhail Hancharenka, a Belarusian engineer who died in 1993 in the wake of the infamous Chernobyl disaster and who was a big football fan. His mother was the manager of a small shop in Belarus. Viktor joined a football school at the young age of 9 years old where his parents encouraged him to do his best to be as successful as possible.

Football was a major part of his life and his father was very impressed with his knowledge of the sport. In 1995, after his father's death, Viktor became a student at the Republic College of Olympic Reserve in Minsk, Belarus. In the RUOR, Viktor got most of his footballing knowledge. He also met other famous Belarusian footballers Alexander Hleb, Vitali Kutuzov and Yuri Zhevnov.

In 1998, Viktor joined BATE Borisov.

Playing career 
Hancharenka's playing career began in 1995, when he made his debut as a defender aged 18. While playing for BATE Borisov Viktar became a champion of Belarusian Premier League in 1999, 2002, silver prize winner in 1998, 2000 and bronze prize winner in 2001. At the age of 25 Hancharenka was forced to retire through injury.

Coaching career 
Before he became head manager of BATE, Hancharenka was assistant manager at FC BATE under coaches Yuri Puntus and Igor Kriushenko. In 2007 Viktar become a head coach of BATE and won the national championship (2008, 2009, 2010). Under Hancharenka's leadership, BATE in 2008 became the first club from Belarus to qualify for the lucrative group stages of the UEFA Champions League and in 2009–2010 of the UEFA Europa League.

In 2011 Hancharenka and his BATE defeated AZ 4–1 in the group stage of the UEFA Europa League and this allowed the team to advance to the 1/16 stages of the UEFA Europa League Cup.

In August 2011 Hancharenka led his club into the group stage of the Champions League again.

Kuban Krasnodar
On 12 October 2013, Hancharenka was appointed as manager of Russian Premier League side Kuban Krasnodar. Leaving the club by mutual consent on 13 November 2014.

Ural
Hancharenka was appointed as manager of Ural Sverdlovsk Oblast on 14 June 2015. After only 6 games in charge, on 25 August 2015, it was reported that Hancharenka had left Ural, and that he wouldn't take charge of the clubs week 7 fixture on 28 August 2015 against Terek Grozny. Subsequently, Hancharenka's contract being terminated by mutual consent on 1 September 2015.

Ufa
On 6 June 2016, Hancharenka was appointed as manager of FC Ufa. On 12 December 2016, he left Ufa by mutual consent.

CSKA Moscow
On 12 December 2016, Hancharenka was announced as the new manager of CSKA Moscow, on a two-year contract. Under his management, CSKA won the 2018 Russian Super Cup. In the 2018–19 UEFA Champions League group stage, CSKA defeated the title holders Real Madrid twice, including a 3–0 victory away at Santiago Bernabéu, but remained last in the group as they only gained 1 point in 4 remaining group games.

On 20 May 2020, Goncharenko extended his contract with CSKA until the summer of 2021. On 22 March 2021, Goncharenko left his role as head coach of CSKA Moscow by mutual consent.

Krasnodar
On 6 April 2021, he signed a contract with FC Krasnodar until the end of the 2022–23 season. On 5 January 2022, Krasnodar announced that Goncharenko had been sacked as head coach of the club.

Return to Ural
On 15 August 2022, Goncharenko returned to FC Ural Yekaterinburg.

Managerial statistics

Honours

As a player
BATE Borisov
Belarusian Premier League: 1999, 2002

As a coach
BATE Borisov
Belarusian Premier League: 2008, 2009, 2010, 2011, 2012
Belarusian Cup: 2009–10
Belarusian Super Cup: 2010, 2011, 2013

CSKA Moscow
Russian Super Cup: 2018

Individual
 Belarusian Premier League Manager of the Year: 2008, 2009, 2010, 2012, 2014, 2016, 2017
 IFFHS The 17th place in World's Best Club Coach of the Year list: 2008
 Russian Premier League Manager of the Month: October 2022

References

External links
 Goncharenko's profile on FC BATE's Russian language website

Belarusian footballers
Belarusian football managers
FC BATE Borisov managers
1977 births
People from Chojniki District
Living people
FC RUOR Minsk players
FC BATE Borisov players
FC Kuban Krasnodar managers
Russian Premier League managers
Expatriate football managers in Russia
Belarusian expatriate football managers
FC Ural Yekaterinburg managers
FC Ufa managers
PFC CSKA Moscow managers
FC Krasnodar managers
Association football defenders
Sportspeople from Gomel Region